Turbonilla ratusukunai is a species of sea snail, a marine gastropod mollusk in the family Pyramidellidae, the pyrams and their allies. It can be found in the Fiji Islands.

References

External links
 To Encyclopedia of Life
 To World Register of Marine Species

ratusukunai
Gastropods described in 2010